Acmella oleracea is a species of flowering herb in the family Asteraceae. Common names include toothache plant, Szechuan buttons, paracress, buzz buttons, tingflowers and electric daisy. Its native distribution is unclear, but it is likely derived from a Brazilian Acmella species. A small, erect plant, it grows quickly and bears gold and red inflorescences. It is frost-sensitive but perennial in warmer climates.

Culinary uses
For culinary purposes, small amounts of shredded fresh leaves are said to add a unique flavour to salads. Cooked leaves lose their strong flavour and may be used as leafy greens. Both fresh and cooked leaves are used in dishes such as stews in northern Brazil, especially in the state of Pará. They are combined with chilis and garlic to add flavor and vitamins to other foods.

The flower bud has a grassy taste followed by a strong tingling or numbing sensation and often excessive salivation, with a cooling sensation in the throat. The buds are known as "buzz buttons", "Sichuan buttons", "sansho buttons", and "electric buttons". In India, they are used as flavoring in chewing tobacco.

A concentrated extract of the plant, sometimes called jambu oil or jambu extract, is used as a flavoring agent in foods, chewing gum, and chewing tobacco. The oil is traditionally extracted from all parts of the plant. EFSA and JECFA reviewed a feeding study in rats and both authorities recognized that the no adverse effect level for spilanthol was 572 mg/kg b.w./day, yielding a safe dose of spilanthol of 1.9 mg/kg b.w./day, or 133.5 mg/70-kg-male/day, 111 mg/58-kg-female/day, or 38 mg/20-kg-child/day.

Jambu extract as a flavoring agent is described as having a citrus, herbal, tropical or musty odor, and its taste can be described as pungent, cooling, tingling, numbing, or effervescent. Spilanthol, the major constituent of jambu extract, is responsible for the perception of a mouth-watering flavor sensation, as well as the ability to promote salivation as a sialogogue, perhaps through its astringent action or its pungent taste.

Cultivation
This plant prefers well-drained, black (high organic content) soil. If starting outdoors, the seeds should not be exposed to cold weather, so start after last frost. Seeds need direct sunlight to germinate, so should not be buried.

Traditional medicine

A decoction or infusion of the leaves and flowers has been used as a folk remedy.

Active chemicals

The most important taste-active molecules present are fatty acid amides such as spilanthol, which is responsible for the trigeminal and saliva-inducing effects of the plant. It also contains stigmasteryl-3-O-b-D-glucopyranoside and a number of triterpenes. The isolation and total synthesis of the active ingredients have been reported.

Biological pest control
Extracts were bioassayed against yellow fever mosquito (Aedes aegypti) and corn earworm moth (Helicoverpa zea) larvae. The spilanthol proved effective at killing mosquitoes, with a 24-hour LD100 of 12.5 µg/mL, and 50% mortality at 6.25 µg/mL. The mixture of spilanthol isomers produced a 66% weight reduction of corn earworm larvae at 250 µg/mL after 6 days.

See also
 Sichuan pepper

References

External links 
 

oleracea
Flora of Brazil
Leaf vegetables
Medicinal plants of South America